The Sardinian regional election of 1957 took place on 16 June 1957.

Five more seats were added.

After the election Giuseppe Brotzu, the incumbent Christian Democratic President, was re-elected President by the Regional Council. However, as soon as in 1958 Efisio Corrias replaced him at the head of a new government that included the Sardinian Action Party, a social-liberal regionalist party.

Results

Sources: Regional Council of Sardinia and Istituto Cattaneo

References

Elections in Sardinia
1957 elections in Italy